Alain Moussi is a Canadian actor, stuntman, and martial artist trained in jujitsu, kickboxing, and karate. He plays the lead role of Kurt Sloane in the reboot of the Kickboxer series, Kickboxer: Vengeance (2016) and Kickboxer: Retaliation (2018), a role that was originated by Jean-Claude Van Damme, who portrays his mentor in the films. Moussi also played the lead role in the action film Jiu Jitsu (2020), the role of Charlie Nash in the web series Street Fighter: Resurrection (2016), and Batman in the first season of the television series Titans (2018).

As a stuntman, he has doubled for Henry Cavill (Immortals), Jason Clarke (White House Down), Josh Helman (X-Men: Days of Future Past), Travis Fimmel (Warcraft), Hugh Jackman (X-Men: Apocalypse), and Jai Courtney (Suicide Squad). In addition to stunts and acting, Moussi owns and operates K2 Martial Arts (formerly NX Martial Arts and Fitness) in Orleans, Ottawa, Canada.

Martial arts
Moussi began his martial arts training in the art of jiu jitsu under Canadian martial arts instructor John Therien as well as practicing kickboxing under kickboxing champion Jean-Yves Theriault. He had also trained in Brazilian jiu-jitsu under Carlos Machado, eventually earning his black belt in the art.

Film career

Moussi got his start as a stuntman and credits Jean Frenette, a former world martial arts champion turned stunt coordinator for films, with giving him his start. His first job was doubling Henry Cavill in the film Immortals. He has also doubled for Aaron Eckhart in Erased, Mike "The Miz" Mizanin in  The Marine 3: Homefront and Christmas Bounty, Jason Clarke in White House Down, Josh Helman in X-Men: Days of Future Past, Travis Fimmel in Warcraft, Hugh Jackman in X-Men: Apocalypse, and Jai Courtney in Suicide Squad.

At the 2014 Cannes Film Festival, it was announced by producer/director Dimitri Logothetis that he would get his first leading role in a reboot of the 1989 film Kickboxer, which starred Jean-Claude Van Damme. In Kickboxer: Vengeance, Moussi played Kurt Sloane, a young martial artist who must refine his skills to avenge his brother's death. Van Damme took on the role of Kurt's teacher, named Master Durand. The film received mixed reviews but resulted in two sequels, Kickboxer: Retaliation, released in 2017, and Kickboxer: Syndicate, which began production in February 2017. The sequels bring Moussi back as Kurt Sloane and in addition, Moussi and longtime friend Jean-Francois LaChappelle served as fight choreographers on Retaliation.

Moussi also played the role of Charlie Nash in the web series sequel Street Fighter: Resurrection.

In 2018, Moussi worked in the Titans episode "Dick Grayson", where he and Maxime Savaria did the uncredited stunt performances of Batman.

In the summer of 2019, Moussi worked alongside Nicolas Cage, Tony Jaa, Frank Grillo, and JuJu Chan on the sci-fi martial arts film Jiu Jitsu, released in November 2020. In 2021, he had a small role as a thug on a bus who fights Bob Odenkirk's character in the action comedy Nobody.

Personal life
Moussi's father, Jean Moussi, immigrated to Canada from Lebanon, and his mother, Rita Moussi, is French Canadian. He has a daughter.

Selected filmography
 NX Files (2005)
 The Day (2011)
 Transporter: The Series (2012)
 White House Down (2013)
 Pompeii (2014)
 Being Human (2014)
 Wolves (2014)
 Only I... (2014)
 Street Fighter: Resurrection (2016)
 Kickboxer: Vengeance (2016)
 Kill Order (2017)
 Kickboxer: Retaliation (2018)
 Titans (2018) as Batman (stunt double, alongside Maxime Savaria)
 American Gods (2019)
 V Wars (2019)
 Jiu Jitsu (2020)
 Nobody (2021)

References

External links

 
 

Canadian male film actors
Canadian male actors of Asian descent
Canadian people of French descent
Canadian people of Lebanese descent
Canadian stunt performers
Canadian jujutsuka
Living people
People from Libreville
1981 births
French-Canadian people
Franco-Ontarian people
Gabonese emigrants to Canada